Jalan Tok Dagang (Negeri Sembilan state route N101 ) is a major road in Negeri Sembilan, Malaysia. It serves most of the neighbourhoods in Ampangan and Paroi.

List of junctions

Roads in Negeri Sembilan